Crisilla ugesae is a species of minute sea snail, a marine gastropod mollusk or micromollusk in the family Rissoidae.

Description

Distribution

References

 Oliver, J. D.; Rolán, E.; Templado, J. (2019). The littoral species of the genus Crisilla Monterosato, 1917 (Caenogastropoda, Rissoidae) in Azores, Madeira, Selvagens and Canary Islands with notes on West African taxa and the description of four new species. Iberus. 37(1): 23-80

External links
 Verduin A. (1988). On the taxonomy of some Rissoacean species from Europe, Madeira and the Canary Islands. Basteria 52: 9-35

Rissoidae
Gastropods described in 1988